Central Baptist Theological Seminary may refer to:

Central Baptist Theological Seminary in Shawnee, Kansas, affiliated with American Baptist Churches USA. Central Baptist Theological Seminary was founded in 1901. Their mission is to prepare leaders for seeking God, shaping church, and serving humanity and all creation. They offer graduate and certification courses in religious and ministry leadership.
Central Baptist Theological Seminary of Minneapolis in Plymouth, Minnesota, an independent fundamental Baptist graduate school of theology 
Central Baptist Theological Seminary in Virginia Beach, Virginia, a Baptist graduate school of theology